"Jikhav Kozak za Dunaj" (trans. The Cossack Rode beyond the Danube) is one of the most famous Ukrainian folk songs. It was written by the Ukrainian philosopher and poet .

Under the name "Schöne Minka" it became popular in Germany too. The German title comes from the first words of a poem by Christoph August Tiedge, "Schöne Minka, ich muß scheiden".

Compositions
 Franciszek Lessel: "Jichaw Kozak z za Dunaju", Eight Variations in a minor on a Russian Theme for piano, Op. 15, no. 1. 1814 (earliest known example of "Minka" reception in Western professional music)
 Ludwig van Beethoven: "Schöne Minka, ich muss scheiden!", Lieder verschiedener Völker (Songs of Various Nations), no. 16. 1816
 Ludwig van Beethoven: "Schöne Minka", Ten National Airs with Variations for Flute and Piano, Op. 107, no. 7. 1818–19
 Carl Maria von Weber: Nine Variations in C minor on a Russian Theme "Schöne Minka", Op. 40, J. 179 for piano
 Johann Nepomuk Hummel: Adagio, Variations and Rondo in A major, Op. 78 "Schöne Minka" for flute cello and piano
 Spike Jones recorded a swing version of "Minka" in the 1940s in the United States
 Yury Kazakov and Willard Palmer: Variations on a Ukrainian Theme, Їхав козак за Дунай
 Jill Ann Jones arranged "Minka – Russian Folk Song" with winter and bells themed lyrics in 1993 which became popular with schoolchildren choirs

Music

Lyrics

Schöne Minka lyrics and English translation

Minka lyrics from Jill Ann Jones arrangement

Merry bells go tingalingle, 
toes and fingers freeze and tingle. 
With our friends we love to mingle 
while the snowflakes fall.

Boys and girls are out together, 
clad in coats of fur and leather, 
made to brave the coldest weather 
when the sleighbells ring.

Sleighbells ring, tingaling, steeple bells, ding dong ding. 
Tingaling, tingaling, ding dong ding; ding dong ding.

As we ride our song goes ringing. 
through the air its echoes winging, 
'til the wind seems full of singing, 
as we speed along.

Through the town and by the river
where the birches sigh and quiver
and the birds are silent never, 
joining in our song.

See also
 Ty zh mene pidmanula
 Yes, My Darling Daughter

References

Ukrainian folk songs
Chamber music by Ludwig van Beethoven
18th-century songs